Wings are appendages used to create lift.

Wings may also refer to:

People
 Wings Hauser (born 1947), American actor
 Mary Wings (born 1949), American artist, writer and musician

Entertainment

Films 
 The Wings (film), a 1916 Swedish silent film
 Wings (1927 film), an American silent World War I film
 Wings (1966 film), a Soviet film by Larisa Shepitko
 Wings (2012 film), a Russian animated film

Written fiction and drama
 Wings (Kuzmin novel), a 1906 novel by Mikhail Kuzmin
 Wings (Pike novel), a 2009 young-adult faerie novel by Aprilynne Pike
 Wings (play), a 1978 Arthur Kopit play
 Wings (musical), a 1992 musical based on the Kopit play
 Wings (Terry Pratchett novel), a novel in The Nome Trilogy
 The Wings (Yi Sang), a 1936 novel by Yi Sang

Music

Groups 
 Wings, a 1970s rock band led by Paul McCartney
 Wings (1968 band), an American folk rock band
 Wings (duo), a South Korean duo

Albums
 Wings (Franco Ambrosetti album) (1984)
 Wings (BTS album) (2016)
 Wings (Mark Chesnutt album) (1995)
 Wings (Peter Kater album) (2019)
 Wings (Skylark album) (2006)
 Wings (Bonnie Tyler album) (2005)
 Wings (EP), by Koda Kumi (2023)
 Wings by Michel Colombier (1971)

Songs
 "Wings" (1927 film score), written by Ballard Macdonald and composed by J.S. Zamecnik
 "Wings" (Birdy song), 2013
 "Wings" (Polina Bogusevich song), 2017
 "Wings" (Delta Goodrem song), 2015
 "Wings" (Little Mix song), 2012
 "Wings" (Macklemore & Ryan Lewis song), 2011
 "Wings" (Ringo Starr song), 1977
 "Wings", by Black Eyed Peas from Masters of the Sun Vol. 1
 "Wings", by Tim Buckley from Tim Buckley
 "Wings", by EDEN from Vertigo
 "Wings", by Golden Earring from Just Earrings
 "Wings", by Haerts
 "Wings", by Live from Songs from Black Mountain
 "Wings", by Mac Miller from Swimming
 "Wings", by Sentenced from North from Here
 "Wings", by Soulfly from Prophecy

Periodicals
 Wings (Canadian magazine), a business and commercial aviation magazine
 Wings (Japanese magazine), a shōjo manga magazine
 Wings (US magazine), a magazine about the history of military aviation

Television 
 Wings (1990 TV series), an American sitcom that aired on NBC from 1990 to 1997
 "Wings", a 1996 UK TV pilot remake of the 1990 US series
 Wings (1988 TV program), a 1988 American documentary on Discovery Channel
 Wings (UK TV series), a 1977–1978 British drama series that aired on BBC
 "Wings", an episode of The Protector

Video games 
 Wings (1990 video game), a World War I computer flying game by Cinemaware
 Wings (1996 video game), a computer game with space ships

Computing 
 WINGs, a Widget toolkit used by Window Maker
 Wings 3D, an open source computer graphics modeling program
 WINGs Display Manager, a display manager for the X window system

Military
 Wing (military aviation unit), a unit of command
 Aircrew Badge or wings, worn in the United States military
 Aircrew brevet or wings, worn in the Royal Air Force and other Commonwealth air forces
 Parachutist Badge or wings
 United States Aviator Badge or wings

Sports teams 
 Dallas Wings, a WNBA team based in the Dallas–Fort Worth Metroplex
 Detroit Red Wings, an NHL team known colloquially as the Wings
 Kalamazoo Wings, an ice hockey team based in Kalamazoo, Michigan, United States
 Philadelphia Wings (disambiguation), the name of three lacrosse teams
 Starwings Basel, a Swiss basketball team
 Wings Gaming, a professional Dota 2 eSports team based in China

Transportation
 ANA Wings, subsidiary of All Nippon Airways
 MASwings, subsidiary of Malaysia Airlines
 Wings Air, a scheduled commuter passenger airline based in Jakarta, Indonesia
 Wings Alliance, a former proposed airline alliance

Other uses 
 Wings (Chinese constellation)
 Wings (cigarette), a brand of the Brown & Williamson Tobacco Corporation
 Wings (haircut), a haircut style
 Wings (horse), a British Thoroughbred racehorse
Wings (Indonesian company), an Indonesian consumer goods company 
 The wings, an area of a theatre stage hidden from the audience
 WINGS: Women IN Great Sciences
 Backplate and wing, a type of scuba harness with an attached buoyancy compensation device
 Buffalo wings, a spicy preparation of fried chicken wings

See also 
 Wing (disambiguation)
 Wingz (disambiguation)